John Alfray (fl. 1421–1422) was an English politician.

Family
Alfray's father, John Alfray, was MP for East Grinstead in 1391. His two sons, John and Richard, were also MPs for the town.

Career
He was a Member (MP) of the Parliament of England for East Grinstead in December 1421 and 1422.

References

Year of birth missing
Year of death missing
English MPs December 1421
English MPs 1422